Borj is a village in Ordughesh Rural District, Zeberkhan District, Nishapur County, Razavi Khorasan Province, Iran. At the 2006 census, its population was 1,429, in 335 families.

References 

Populated places in Nishapur County